Tranquility is an album by American jazz saxophonist Lee Konitz's Quartet recorded in 1957 and released on the Verve label.

Critical reception

Jason Ankeny of Allmusic states "crafted with startling precision and economy, Tranquility extols the virtues of mood and shape with Talmudic zeal, towering astride thought and expression. ...Rarely is music so profoundly cerebral also so deeply heartfelt".

Track listing 
 "Stephanie" (Lee Konitz) – 3:57
 "Memories of You" (Eubie Blake, Andy Razaf) – 3:12
 "People Will Say We're in Love" (Richard Rodgers, Oscar Hammerstein II) – 4:57   
 "When You're Smiling" (Mark Fisher, Joe Goodwin, Larry Shay) – 3:48
 "Sunday" (Chester Conn, Benny Krueger, Ned Miller, Jule Styne) – 3:26
 "Lennie Bird" (Lennie Tristano) – 5:25
 "The Nearness of You" (Hoagy Carmichael, Ned Washington) – 6:09
 "Jonquil" (Werner Bauer) – 3:09

Personnel 
Lee Konitz – alto saxophone
Billy Bauer – guitar
Henry Grimes – bass
Dave Bailey – drums

References 

Lee Konitz albums
1957 albums
Verve Records albums